Maximiano Oliveira Salvador (born 25 February 1942) is a former Portuguese professional footballer.

Career statistics

Club

Notes

References

External links

1942 births
Living people
Portuguese footballers
Portugal youth international footballers
Association football defenders
Primeira Liga players
S.L. Benfica footballers